Remy-Luc Auberjonois (born January 21, 1974) is an American actor. He is best known for his recurring role as Mr. Albin in the television series Weeds and as Dr. Emerson on the television series Mad Men.

Career
Auberjonois played Walter Elkins in the "We'll Always Have Paris" episode in the ABC Television series, Pan Am. He appeared in "Believe in the Stars", Episode 2, Season 3 of 30 Rock, playing Tyler Brody, a fake Olympian. He appeared as Hardeen (the brother of Harry Houdini) in HBO's Boardwalk Empire. He appeared in Law & Order Episode 435, that aired on October 2, 2009.

Personal life
Auberjonois is the son of René Auberjonois and Judith Mihalyi. He is married to actress Kate Nowlin.  They live in Minneapolis, Minnesota.

Filmography

Film

Television

Stage Credits

References

External links
 

1974 births
Living people
20th-century American male actors
21st-century American male actors
American male film actors
American male television actors
Male actors from Santa Monica, California